Avenida Belgrano is an avenue that runs through Montserrat, Balvanera and Almagro neighborhoods of Buenos Aires, Argentina.

The avenue crosses other major avenues like Huergo, Paseo Colon, Diagonal Sur and 9 de Julio.

The avenue was so named in honor of Manuel Belgrano.

Gallery

References

Belgrano